The 1928 Pacific hurricane season ran through the summer and fall of 1928. Before the satellite age started in the 1960s, data on east Pacific hurricanes was extremely unreliable. Most east Pacific storms were of no threat to land.

Systems

Tropical Cyclone One
A weak tropical cyclone existed south of the Gulf of California was spotted on May 24. It moved westward, and was last seen on May 27.

Tropical Cyclone Two
A tropical cyclone in the Gulf of Tehuantepec produced gales on June 5.

Hurricane Three
A hurricane existed south of Cape Corrientes on July 28 and 29.

Hurricane Four
A tropical cyclone was noticed just south of the Mexican coast on August 6. This system might have formed south of Costa Rica three days earlier. Wherever it formed, this tropical cyclone intensified into a hurricane, and paralleled the coast. It passed south of the Gulf of California on August 10. The hurricane passed northwestward of Cabo San Lucas on September, and dissipated on August 11 while over the southern part of the Baja California Peninsula.

This hurricane brought gale or hurricane-force winds to several areas of the Mexican coast. An American steamer, the William A. McKenney, had its cargo and structure damaged by the hurricane. Repairs were attempted during the storm, and 14 members of its crew were washed overboard and drowned.

Tropical Cyclone Five
On September 1, a tropical cyclone formed well south of the southern tip of the Baja California Peninsula. It moved west-northwest and was last seen on September 3.

Hurricane Six
About 200 miles west-southwest of Acapulco, a tropical cyclone formed on September 17. It slowly moved northwestward. It had intensified into a hurricane by September 18. On September 21, the hurricane weakened and recurved to the east-northeast. It made landfall north of Mazatlán and became a remnant over Mexico. Its remnants had crossed Mexico by September 22 and entered the Gulf of Mexico south of Brownsville, Texas. They never developed into anything, and had dissipated by the end of the month.

Tropical Cyclone Seven
From September 20 to 22, a tropical cyclone existed south of the Gulf of Tehuantepec.

Hurricane Eight
On October 7, at a location well south of the entrance to the Gulf of California, a hurricane existed. It was moving northwest.

Tropical Cyclone Nine
On October 16 and 17, a ship encountered a tropical cyclone well south of the southern Tip of the Baja California Peninsula.

See also

1928 Atlantic hurricane season
1928 Pacific typhoon season
1920s North Indian Ocean cyclone seasons
 1900–1940 South Pacific cyclone seasons
 1900–1950 South-West Indian Ocean cyclone seasons
 1920s Australian region cyclone seasons

References

1928 in Mexico
Pacific hurricane seasons
1920s Pacific hurricane seasons